FC Meskheti (Georgian: საფეხბურთო კლუბი მესხეთი) is a defunct Georgian football club based in Akhaltsikhe. 

Most recently the club took part in Regionuli Liga, the fifth tier of Georgian league system, although in the late 2000s they spent two seasons in the top division.

Meskheti ceased their activities in early 2021.

History

Founded in 2005, the club initially participated in Pirveli Liga for the first two years. Meskheti finished 2nd in 2007 and gained promotion to Umaglesi Liga, where they spent two seasons. 

In 2008 certain financial problems hit the club, which was denied assistance from the local municipality. 

The next July, unable to meet the requirements necessary for a top-league team, Meskheti were expelled to the second division with 3 points deducted. With the crisis unsolved, the club finished at the bottom of the table and in the 2010-11 season they failed to take part in any league.

Meskheti rejoined Pirveli Liga in 2011. A year later the club once again suspended its participation in official tournaments.     

Later, in 2016, Meskheti participated in Group Centre of Meore Liga and then became a member of Regionuli Liga. After the 2020 season they withdrew.

Current squad

Honours
Pirveli Liga
 Silver Medal winner: 2007
 Bronze Medal winner: 1995

City Derby
FC Samtskhe was established in the city in 2019. Meskheti lost 1–0 the only match held on 23 September 2020 between the rivals.

Name
Meskheti, being a synonym of Samtskhe, is a part of the Samtskhe-Javakheti region.

References

Meskheti
Defunct football clubs in Georgia (country)